Alberto Bello (1897–1963) was an Argentine actor who appeared in more than 40 films during his career including Madame Bovary (1947).

Selected filmography
 Marriage in Buenos Aires (1940)
 Isabelita (1940)
 El tesoro de la isla Maciel (1941)
 El Fin de la Noche (1944)
 Back in the Seventies (1945)
 Road of Hell (1946)
 Madame Bovary (1947)
 The Black Market (1953)

References

External links

Bibliography
 Goble, Alan. The Complete Index to Literary Sources in Film. Walter de Gruyter, 1999.

1897 births
1963 deaths
Argentine male film actors
People from Buenos Aires
Burials at La Chacarita Cemetery
1963 suicides
Suicides by train
Suicides in Argentina